Great Scott! is the debut album by organist Shirley Scott recorded in 1958 for the Prestige label.

Reception

The Allmusic review stated "Great Scott! was her first out-front contribution to popularizing the organ in a jazz format that also drew on parts of blues and soul music. She displays admirable command of the instrument's swoops and funky glows here".

Track listing 
 "Brazil" (Ary Barroso) - 2:26 
 "The Scott" (Shirley Scott) - 3:05  
 "Cherokee" (Ray Noble) - 5:19  
 "Nothing Ever Changes My Love for You" (Marvin Fisher, Jack Segal) - 4:36 
 "Trees" (Joyce Kilmer, Oscar Rasbach) - 6:57  
 "All of You" (Cole Porter) - 3:20  
 "Goodbye" (Gordon Jenkins) - 5:00
 "Four" (Miles Davis) - 3:53

Personnel 
 Shirley Scott - organ
 George Duvivier - bass
 Arthur Edgehill - drums

References 

1959 debut albums
Albums produced by Bob Weinstock
Albums recorded at Van Gelder Studio
Prestige Records albums
Shirley Scott albums